is a Japanese manga series written and illustrated by Ming Ming based on the Neon Genesis Evangelion franchise. It was serialized in the shōjo manga magazine Monthly Asuka between 2007 and 2009, published by Kadokawa Shoten, and is also available in the PlayStation Store.  It has been collected in four volumes.

Many of the main characters from Neon Genesis Evangelion return, including Shinji Ikari, Rei Ayanami, Kaworu Nagisa, Asuka Langley Soryu, Toji Suzuhara, Misato Katsuragi, and Kensuke Aida. Though the series uses the same characters, story, and setting, it does differ from the Neon Genesis Evangelion manga.

The official English translation of the series is published by Dark Horse Comics starting in August 2010.

Plot
Shinji Ikari attends the NERV Foundation Academy and lives a relatively boring but peaceful life. During a typical outing at night to a nearby vending machine, he witnesses Rei Ayanami and another boy he has never seen before fleeing from the scene of a violent explosion. Startled by the incident, he accidentally finds an unusual gem.

The next day, he meets Kaworu Nagisa, a transfer student to the NERV Foundation Academy and the same boy Shinji had seen the previous night. When Shinji tries to discover the truth behind Rei's relationship with Kaworu, he soon finds himself forcibly recruited to assist them and Asuka Langley Soryu fight against "Angels", beings who wish to destroy humanity by obtaining "Cores", one of which is the gem found by Shinji.

Shinji soon receives an "EVA", the manifestation of the most powerful form of his will, in order to combat the Angels.  Accompanying the group on their nightly patrols around the city and investigating strange phenomena, Shinji must protect civilians who are disappearing, though in reality have been killed by Angels and their bodies used as vessels, all without revealing the truth to his friends.

Characters
 Shinji Ikari
 The protagonist, Shinji lives a relatively peaceful but boring life attending a local Catholic school. His mother died when he was a child and his father works abroad, so Shinji's legal guardian is Kaji, one of his father's former subordinates. He finds his life changed forever when he becomes involved with Rei Ayanami and Kaworu Nagisa as they hunt the "Angels" and capture them. He apparently has mysterious powers of his own, which allow him to drive off Ramiel, the first Angel he encounters. His Eva weapon manifested itself as a gun. Shinji appears to have a crush on Rei, but also develops a strong, almost intimate, friendship with Kaworu where they care greatly for each other's opinion and well-being.

 Rei Ayanami
 A beautiful, but distant girl described by Toji to be classy, but gloomy and is admired by Shinji. Most people in the class consider her an oddball, though she is exceptionally talented at anything she is told to do, especially if Asuka tells her that it is a "mission". Rei leads a secret life, working as a Shamash Guardian for a group hidden in the school, to fight against Angels. She wields the Lance of Longinus in combat. As revealed in chapter eight, she is an "artificially created child", meaning that she has no parents, and she has spent most of her life in a facility.

 Kaworu Nagisa
 A transfer student who takes an interest in Shinji, who is suspicious of his relationship with Rei, Kaworu secretly fights against Angels and has the ability to generate an AT Field to defend against attackers and his Eva manifests as a sword. He uses the name Tabris to play online games. He, as revealed in chapter eight, is an "artificially created child" and has spent all of his life until now in facilities. He is ignorant of many social customs, and considers himself to be close friends with Shinji, even if he seemed to have had more than friendly feelings for him, and it is not stated explicitly.

 Asuka Langley Soryu
 Asuka is considered to be an attractive and stylish foreign student by the children in Shinji's class. She is also involved with the Shamash Guardians fighting against Angels and appears to be on relatively good terms with Kaworu and Rei. She is apparently outspoken and has little patience for novices like Shinji, though does not display these aspects of her personality with her classmates. Asuka wields a whip when fighting against angels and is proud of her abilities. As revealed in chapter eight she is the only one out of the three (Kaworu, Rei, and herself) who has parents, and unlike the other children, she has been enrolled in school prior to her assignment as a Shamash Guardian.

 Toji Suzuhara, Kensuke Aida, and Hikari Horaki
 Toji and Kensuke are Shinji's friends. Kensuke is a conspiracy fanatic and has knowledge about supposed prophecies involving Angels and the destruction of the world while Toji is more sceptical of these claims. They take an interest in the girls in the class, commenting on both Rei and Asuka, and enjoy playing MMORPGs. Hikari is the class representative of Shinji's class. Kensuke has recently been controlled by Iruel into freeing her from the computer which he succeeds at in Chapter 14.

 Misato Katsuragi, Ritsuko Akagi, and Kōzō Fuyutsuki
 Misato is Shinji's class teacher and she and Kaji are old acquaintances, though Misato does not seem to have a positive opinion of him. Before becoming a teacher, she is worked in the same facilities as Kaji. Ritsuko works as the nurse at Shinji's school, who apparently is aware of Rei's activities involving the "Angels", and treats Rei and Shinji after their first fight with Ramiel. However, Ritsuko's actual loyalties may not live with NERV, as Kaworu remarks upon when he comes to see her. Fuyutsuki is mentioned in chapter 11 as the vice-principal of NERV Academy, and one of the teachers who is aware of the Angels.

 Makoto Hyuga, Maya Ibuki, and Shigeru Aoba
 Mentioned in chapter 11 as teachers at NERV Academy who are aware of the Angels. Hyuga is the current events teacher, Ibuki works as the mathematics teacher, and Aoba is employed as a chemistry teacher.

 Kaede Agano, Satsuki Ooi, and Aoi Mogami
 All three appear in chapter 11 and appear to be teachers in the school. When introduced, they are all dressed as nuns.

 Ryoji Kaji
 Shinji's guardian, a journalist and photographer, who was once a subordinate of Shinji's father. He appears to recognize Kaworu Nagisa upon their first meeting, and also has ties to Misato. He disapproves of Shinji's nightly walks, particularly in light of recent civilian disappearances.

 Gendo Ikari
 Shinji's father, and the commander of NERV. He's introduced at the end of chapter 11, much to Shinji's shock since Shinji had believed that his father was dead. Originally, Kaji believed that Gendo had died in a past incident when Kaji was still his subordinate, but learned his former superior was alive when Gendo requested that Kaji act as Shinji's legal guardian while Shinji attends school. He is cold and to the point, though Shinji remarks that his father was not so cold in the past, and is apparently fixated on the circumstances behind the death of his wife, Yui Ikari.

 The ANGELS
 Beings which have appeared in order to claim "Cores" embodied as small spherical objects in order to eventually destroy the humanity. Originally supporting devices for the Yggdrasil, the Angels refuse to accept their fate and escape, expressing that their motives are only to live in peace, even if meant the Yggdrasil withers and all realities are converged as a result. The Angels possess no real bodies of their own, consisting only of a consciousness, and must find vessels to inhabit and move between.
 Ramiel
 The first angel to appear in the series, Ramiel kills and possesses the body of a man in order to take the Core Shinji has obtained. He has the ability to generate lightning and transforms the body he possesses so that he gains wings. Though he overpowers first Rei, then Kaworu, inhibited because he was protecting Shinji, Shinji's powers suddenly awaken and he drives Ramiel away. Soon after, he possesses a young woman and approaches Shinji again with the intent of discovering the location of cores. Ramiel is eventually defeated by Asuka and Shinji and her core is removed from her host by Kaworu.
 Shamshel
Appearing in chapter 10, Shamshel takes the form of a teenage girl. She addresses a fellow, yet-unnamed Angel as "brother" and appears to enjoy teasing him.
 Iruel
Appearing in chapter 10, Ireul appears on a series of screens, possibly as a computer program. Its gender has not been specified yet, but it appears to take the form of an androgynous being wearing a mask with three reptilian eyes; two on either side of it and one in the center. It has been confirmed in Chapter 14 that Iruel has taken a female form when she escapes from her prison.
 Leliel
First appearing in chapter 17, Leliel possesses a young man with pale hair and infiltrates the school while Iruel was battling against Shinji and Asuka. He finds and kills an unnamed person from the school before attempting to do that same to Toji and Hikari only to have his core removed by Israfel, one of their halves then chides him for involving innocent humans and states he can remain in that form for a while.
 Israfel
Unlike the other Angels, Israfel is incarnated as human twins Cecilia and Makoto de Nuovo, Japanese/Italian twin siblings who are talented singers that officially debuted in Chapter 5. While Makoto is aware of their Angel heritage, Cecilia has no memory of her true identity despite assuming Angel form during a full moon. As a result, Cecilia is mostly naive to the goals of the other Angels and has even developed a huge infatuation with Shinji with Makoto expressing concern that it might kill her. Despite being angels, the twins refuse to harm innocent humans as they directly meddle in the affairs of Iruel and Leliel and defeat the latter. Makoto later arranges for himself and Cecilia to leave Japan and return to Italy with their mother. While Makoto intended for his sister not become a victim in the crossfire of the final series of battles, he does assure Cecilia that they will see Shinji again someday.

 Other Angels
While they have not been seen yet, chapter 10 has a yet-unnamed Angel in the form of a man calling himself "Mimori" and working for the game company GNX.

Releases

References

Further reading

External links

Dark Horse Comics titles
Mystery anime and manga
Neon Genesis Evangelion manga
Science fiction anime and manga
Shōjo manga
Thriller anime and manga